The Doncaster–Lincoln line is a railway line in England.  It runs from the East Coast Main Line at Doncaster south east to Lincoln.

Services on the line are provided by East Midlands Railway and Northern, with a few continuing through Lincoln to the Peterborough–Lincoln line.

The towns and villages served by the route are listed below.
Doncaster
Gainsborough
Saxilby
Lincoln

The line is part of the former Great Northern and Great Eastern Joint Railway.

Between Doncaster and Gainsborough the line passes between Finningley and Blaxton.  There used to be a station at this point and as this is the site of the new Robin Hood Airport Doncaster Sheffield, there has been discussion about constructing a new station to serve the airport. Planning permission for a station was granted in 2008.

References

Rail transport in Lincolnshire
Rail transport in South Yorkshire
Rail transport in Doncaster
Railway lines in Yorkshire and the Humber
Railway lines in the East Midlands
Standard gauge railways in England